Jacqueline Danell Obradors (born October 6, 1966) is an American actress. She has appeared in films such as Six Days, Seven Nights (1998), Deuce Bigalow: Male Gigolo (1999), Tortilla Soup (2001), A Man Apart (2003) and Unstoppable (2004). She is also the voice of Audrey Rocio Ramirez in Atlantis: The Lost Empire. On television, Obradors is known for her role as Det. Rita Ortiz in the ABC crime drama series NYPD Blue (2001–2005).

Early life
Obradors was born in the San Fernando Valley, the daughter of Argentine immigrants Angie, a church worker, and Albert Obradors, an office cleaning business owner. Before becoming an actress, Jacqueline was a cashier at Hughes Market in Canoga Park, California.

Career
Obradors is best known for playing supporting roles in Six Days, Seven Nights (as Angelica) and A Man Apart, and for her role as Detective Rita Ortiz on the ABC crime drama NYPD Blue (2001–2005). In 2001, Obradors voiced Audrey in Disney's Atlantis: The Lost Empire and its sequel, Atlantis: Milo's Return. In 2003's A Man Apart, she played Stacy Vetter, the murdered wife of Vin Diesel's character DEA Agent Sean Vetter. She appeared on Freddie as Sofia, Freddie's sister, during the 2005–2006 television season. She appeared in one episode of George Lopez as Angie's sister, Gloria. In 2010, she played the recurring role of Paloma Reynosa on NCIS. In 2015, Obradors appeared in an episode of Castle as villainess Allison Hyde. She joined the cast of the Amazon Studios series, Bosch during the fifth season, in the recurring role of Detective Christina Vega.

Partial filmography

Television

AudioBooks

References

External links
 

1966 births
20th-century American actresses
21st-century American actresses
Actresses from California
American television actresses
American people of Argentine descent
Hispanic and Latino American actresses
Living people
People from the San Fernando Valley